The 1999 Copa del Rey Final was the 97th final of the Spanish cup competition, the Copa del Rey. The final was played at Estadio Olímpico de Sevilla in Seville on 26 June 1999. The match was won by Valencia, who beat Atlético Madrid 3–0. Valencia won the cup for the sixth time.

Road to the final

Match details

References

External links
 RSSSF.com

1999
1
Valencia CF matches
Atlético Madrid matches
Sports competitions in Seville
20th century in Seville